"What About Us" is a song by American R&B group, Total. The song features guest vocals by Missy Elliott and Timbaland. The song served as the lead single for the soundtrack of the 1997 film, Soul Food. The song also became a smash hit in the United States, where it peaked at #16 on Billboard Hot 100 and #4 on Billboard Hot R&B—scoring them their fifth top ten hit single on the R&B chart and their fourth gold certification.

Music video

The official music video for the song was directed by Christopher Erskin.

Track listings and formats
 European remix single
 "What About Us" (Album Version with Rap) (featuring Missy Elliott) — 4:46   
 "What About Us" (Album Version without Rap) — 4:23
 "What About Us" (Lil Jon Remix) (featuring Sean Paul of YoungBloodZ) — 5:48   
 "What About Us" (Album Instrumental) — 4:18   
 "What About Us" (Lil Jon Remix Instrumental) — 5:48

 US 12" vinyl
 "What About Us" (Album Version w/ Rap) — 4:46
 "What About Us" (Album Version without Rap) — 4:23
 "What About Us" (Beat Box) — 4:29
 "What About Us" (Acappella) — 4:22
 "What About Us" (Instrumental) — 4:18

 US CD single
 "What About Us" — 4:06
 "What About Us" (Instrumental) — 4:11

 US remix single
 "What About Us" (Lil Jon Remix Radio Edit) (featuring Missy Elliott) — 4:06   
 "What About Us" (Lil Jon Remix without Rap) (featuring Missy Elliott) — 4:11
 "What About Us" (Lil Jon Remix Instrumental) — 5:47

Charts

Weekly charts

Year-end charts

Certifications

|}

References

1997 singles
Bad Boy Records singles
LaFace Records singles
Missy Elliott songs
Music videos directed by Christopher Erskin
Songs written by Missy Elliott
Song recordings produced by Timbaland
Songs written by Timbaland
Timbaland songs
Total (group) songs
1997 songs
Songs about infidelity